The Uganda women's national handball team is the national team of Uganda. It is governed by the Uganda Handball Federation and takes part in international handball competitions.

African Championship record
1974 – 4th
1976 – 4th
1979 – 5th

External links
IHF profile

Women's national handball teams
Handball
National team